Nemo, the Classic Comics Library was a magazine devoted to the history and creators of vintage comic strips. Created by comics historian Rick Marschall, it was published between 1983 and 1990 by Fantagraphics.

Nemo ran for 31 issues (the last being a double issue) plus one annual. Most issues were edited by Marschall. The title was taken from the classic comic strip Little Nemo. While some issues were thematic, most were a mix of articles, interviews, comic strip reprints and more.

Marschall later co-founded another magazine about comics, Hogan's Alley.

Nemo Bookshelf
During that same period in the 1980s, Fantagraphics launched an imprint, Nemo Bookshelf, the Classic Comics Library. This was a line of classic comic strip reprint books, including Little Orphan Annie, Pogo, Red Barry, Dickie Dare, The Complete E. C. Segar Popeye and Prince Valiant.

Issues
 Terry and the Pirates 
 Superman
 Popeye
 Flash Gordon
 Fantasy in Comics
 Alley Oop
 Disney legends
 Little Orphan Annie
 Hal Foster Interview
 Cartoon Christmas Cards
 Art of Charles Dana Gibson, Sam's Strip by Mort Walker and Jerry Dumas, Clare Victor Dwiggins, Nervy Nat by James Montgomery Flagg, Slim Jim
 Cartoonists and World War II
 Red Barry
 George McManus
 Milton Caniff's first art script
 Huck Finn
 Dick Tracy
 Al Capp
 Kerry Drake
 Golden Age of Comics Promotion
 King Aroo
 John Held Jr., Jimmy Swinnerton, 100 years ago, Joe Palooka
 Little Orphan Annie, Hi and Lois
 Rube Goldberg
 Edwina Dumm's Cap Stubbs and Tippie, Milton Caniff's advertising work, reminiscences by John Neville Wheeler, early work of Gene Ahern
 T. S. Sullivant's Unforgettable Comic Zoo
 Cartoon Art of Norman Rockwell, "Lovely Lilly" by Carolyn Wells, chalk-plate cartoon production, William Faulkner and The Comics, "White Boy" by Garrett Price
 Ethnic Images
 Gasoline Alley Sunday Pages, interview with Ferd Johnson and Texas Slim strips, Ming Foo by Nicholas Afonsky and Brandon Walsh
 Little Nemo, Joseph Keppler, Ernie Bushmiller
 Double Issue - Charles Schulz Interview, Milton Caniff, Krazy Kat, Cliff Sterrett  
Annual 1 — Screwball Comics Special Milt Gross, Dr. Seuss, Smokey Stover, Rube Goldberg

See also
The Menomonee Falls Gazette
The Menomonee Falls Guardian

References

External links
Rick Marschall interviews Mort Walker (Nemo #5)
Stripper's Guide: Adventures of Lovely Lilly (Nemo #27)

Defunct American comics
Fantagraphics titles
Magazines about comics
Magazines established in 1983
Magazines disestablished in 1990
1983 comics debuts
1990 comics endings